Liriomyza eupatoriella is a species of leaf miners, the larva of a fly in the family Agromyzidae.  The larva of this species mines the leaves of plants of the genus Eupatorium, commonly called "boneset", as well as related plants of other genera, including white snakeroot.

References

Agromyzidae
Diptera of North America